"Eucosma" rigens is a species of moth of the family Tortricidae. It is found in the Democratic Republic of Congo.

References

Moths described in 1938
Eucosmini
Endemic fauna of the Democratic Republic of the Congo